The 34th Brigade was a formation of the British Army. It was one of the New Army (or Kitchener's Army) brigades, and  assigned to the 11th (Northern) Division. It served on the Western Front during the First World War.

Formation
8th Battalion, Northumberland Fusiliers
9th Battalion, Lancashire Fusiliers (disbanded 21 February 1918)
5th Battalion, Dorsetshire Regiment (joined 18 January 1918)
11th Battalion, Manchester Regiment
34th Machine Gun Company (formed March 1916, moved into 11th MG Battalion 28 February 1918)
34th Trench Mortar Battery (joined July 1917)

References

Infantry brigades of the British Army in World War I